Foul out may refer to:

Foul out (basketball)
Foul out (baseball)